Elk City State Park is a state park in Montgomery County, Kansas, United States, located west of Independence.

The  park is adjacent to the  Elk City Reservoir and the  Elk City Wildlife Area. The reservoir offers fishing opportunities for channel catfish, white bass, crappie, flathead catfish, largemouth bass and saugeye. The Wildlife Area offers a chance to view white-tailed deer, wild turkey, bobwhite quail, cottontail, gray squirrel, prairie chicken, beaver, raccoon, bobcat, coyote, gray fox, opossum, mink and muskrat.

A nationally recognized trails system allows visitors to take in a variety of flora and fauna. The Green Thumb Nature Trail at the Timber Road campground is a one-mile loop with a panoramic vista of the lake. At the overlook is the 2/3-mile Post Oak Nature Trail. There is also a paved and handicapped accessible  South Squaw Multipurpose trail. Running outside of the park is the Elk River Hiking Trail, a scenic  route that begins at the west edge of the dam and ends near the U.S. Route 160 bridge on the Elk River.

See also
 List of Kansas state parks
 List of lakes, reservoirs, and dams in Kansas
 List of rivers of Kansas

References

External links

State parks of Kansas
Protected areas of Montgomery County, Kansas
Protected areas established in 1967